The Champaign County YMCA Heat Swim Team (HEAT) is a competitive age group swim program that serves all ages and abilities in Champaign County and the surrounding areas. Participants attend weekly practices in Urbana and Champaign and are offe, determined by their skill. The team is competitive at a national level for the YMCA and USA Swimming.

Focus
HEAT focuses on forming good swimmers in and out of the pool. Coaches strive to make each swimmer reach their peak ability.

Mission statement
"To provide a competitive swim team where participants can select from several levels of competitive intensity. This program shall be safe, educational, and enjoyable while providing for the participant's personal improvement. The team will also develop within its swimmers high levels of self-discipline and fitness, and foster the character development values of honesty, caring, respect, and responsibility for the program, coaches, parents, other teams, and each other."

Affiliations
The Heat is a charter club of USA Swimming/Illinois Swimming and a YMCA affiliated team. Swimmers are eligible to attend both USA Swimming meets and YMCA meets. The Heat is a program of the Champaign County YMCA.

As a USA Swimming team, all swimmers and coaches must hold a current membership. Coaches must also be certified in First Aid, CPR, and Coaches Safety Training.

As a YMCA team, all swimmers and coaches must be members of the YMCA.

Establishment
Heat was established in 2007 after combining the Champaign County Aquachiefs and Storm Aquatics.

Competitive Success
In the Spring of 2008, HEAT sent 11 swimmers to compete at Y-Nationals in Ft. Lauderdale, Florida. HEAT had 4 participants at Y-Nationals in the spring of 2009.

Practice Groups
Groups range in age, ability, and commitment. Group 1 is the most introductory group and grow all the way up to Group 5, the championship group. Separate practice times and workouts are made for each individual group.

Group 1 is designed for beginning swimmers that can complete at least 25 yards of freestyle and 15 yards of backstroke. Practices consist of individual instruction and focus on body awareness, stroke technique, streamline, and some terminology.

Group 2 is generally for athletes ages 7–11. They should be able to complete a 100-yard freestyle, 50-yard backstroke, 25-yard breaststroke, and 25-yard butterfly. The group will focus on improving technique, circle swimming, bilateral breathing, underwater fly kicks off walls, breaststroke pull outs, and introduction to starts and turns.

Group 3 swimmers should be able to complete a 200-yard freestyle, 100-yard backstroke, 50-yard breaststroke, and 50-yard backstroke. This group will introduce the pace clock and sendoffs. Swimmers will focus on refining stroke technique, starts, and turns.

Group 4 is the championship preparation team. Swimmers should be able to complete a 400-yard freestyle, 300-yard backstroke, 200-yard breaststroke, and 100-yard fly with little rest and confidence. The goals of this group are to continue refining stroke technique, increasing speed and endurance training, and mental training growth.

Group 5 is the championship group with focus on national competition. Swimmers should have made an Age Group championship or Senior State Championship time standard. Swimmers must commit to practicing 5 times a week. The group goals include exploring advanced stroke technique, commitment to exceptional work ethic, participation in meets, performing higher levels of speed and endurance sets.

Coaches
The Heat have a head coach and many assistant coaches that help run practices and meets.

Head coach
Will Barker has been coaching for the last 20 years and holds an ASCA level 4 certification. He was the head coach of Storm Aquatics for 14 years, and is currently head coach for Champaign Country Club and Champaign Central High School Girls team. Will swam competitively for 8 years and played water polo at
University of Miami. Will has also coached for the Champaign Aquachiefs, the Champaign Park District, and was the age group coach for Hurricane Aquatics in Miami, Florida. He was an assistant Zone coach in 1993 and 2005 and Head Zone Coach in 2009. In 2006, he was selected for the USAS Coach Mentor program and was spent three days with Richard Quick. Will has coached many outstanding athletes, including Tyler McGill.

Heat Records
All Records are shown with Yard times, revised April 2017.

Boys Records

Girls Records

Facilities
HEAT uses several pools around the Champaign-Urbana area.
Centennial High School offers a six-lane, 25 yard pool. It is located at 913 Crescent Drive, Champaign.
Urbana Indoor Aquatic Center offers an eight-lane, 25 yard x 25 meter pool. It is located at 102 E. Michigan, Urbana.
Stephens Family YMCA offers an eight-lane, 25 yard pool. It is located at 2501 Fields South Drive, Champaign.

References

External links
Champaign County YMCA
Illinois Swimming
USA Swimming
CCYMCA HEAT Swim Team
Champaign County Aquatic Information & Development Corporation

Swim teams in the United States
2007 establishments in Illinois
Sports clubs established in 2007
Sports clubs founded by the YMCA